This is a complete list of former members of the Virginia House of Delegates whose last names begin with the letter A.

External links
The Virginia Elections and State Elected Officials Database Project, 1776-2008
A History of the Virginia House of Delegates

Former members of the Virginia House of Delegates (A)
Members of the Virginia House of Delegates
House of Delegates